Pingali also known as Pingali Kothala is a village and railway station in Parbhani taluka of Parbhani district in the Indian state of Maharashtra.

Demography
According to the 2011 census of India, Pingali had 1,345 households and a population of 6,403, of which 3,222 were male and 3,181 were female. The average sex ratio of the village was 987, which was higher than the Maharashtra state average of 929. The literacy rate was 71% compared to 82.3% for the state. Male literacy rate was 81% while female literacy rate was 61%.

Schedule Caste constituted 19% of total population.

Pingali Railway Station
Pingali Railway Station is away from village Pingali Kothala.

Geography and Transport
Following table shows distance of Pingali from some of major cities.

References

Villages in Parbhani district